Among the longest rivers of Canada are 47 streams of at least . In the case of some rivers such as the Columbia, the length listed in the table below is solely that of the main stem. In the case of others such as the Mackenzie, it is the combined lengths of the main stem and one or more upstream tributaries, as noted. Also excluded are rivers such as the Mississippi, the main stems of which do not enter Canada even though some of their tributaries do.

Nine rivers in this list cross international boundaries or form them. Four—the Yukon, Columbia, Porcupine, and Kootenay—begin in Canada and flow into the United States. Five—the Milk, Pend d'Oreille, Saint Lawrence, Red, and Saint John—begin in the United States and flow into Canada. Of these, the Milk and the Kootenay cross the international border twice, the Milk leaving and then re-entering the United States, the Kootenay leaving and then re-entering Canada. The drainage basins of these nine rivers extend into both countries; in addition, the drainage basins of six others—the Fraser, Assiniboine, South Saskatchewan, Saskatchewan, Nelson, and Winnipeg—extend into the United States even though their main stems flow entirely within Canada. 

Sources report hydrological quantities with varied precision. Biologist and author Ruth Patrick, describing a table of high-discharge rivers, wrote that data on discharge, drainage area, and length varied widely among authors whose works she consulted. "It seems," she said, "that the wisest course is to regard data tables such as the present one as showing the general ranks of rivers, and not to place too much importance on minor (10–20%) differences in figures."

Table
The primary source for data in the table below is The Atlas of Canada; other sources are as noted. Discharge refers to the flow at the mouth except as noted. U.S. states appear in italics. Abbreviations are as follows: "km" for "kilometre", "mi" for "mile", "s" for "second", "m" for "metre", and "ft" for "foot".

See also
List of rivers of Canada

Notes and references
Notes

References

Works cited
Benke, Arthur C., ed., and Cushing, Colbert E., ed. Rivers of North America. Burlington, Massachusetts: Elsevier Academic Press. .

Longest
 
Rivers, longest
Rivers
Canada